The McLaren Vale Football Club was an Australian rules football club that was an inaugural member of the Southern Football Association in 1886.

McLaren competed in the Southern Football League until the end of the 1997 season, when they merged with the McLaren Flat Football Club and McLaren Districts Junior Football Club to form the McLaren Football Club.

A-Grade Premierships
 Southern Football Association A-Grade (7)
 1905, 1906, 1908, 1920, 1924, 1958, 1959
 Southern Football League Division 2 (3)
 1980, 1981, 1995

References

Australian rules football clubs in South Australia
1997 disestablishments in Australia
Sports clubs disestablished in 1997